The Consumer Credit Protection Act (CCPA) is a United States law , composed of several titles relating to consumer credit, mainly title I, the Truth in Lending Act, title II related to extortionate credit transactions, title III related to restrictions on wage garnishment, and title IV related to the National Commission on Consumer Finance.

The restrictions on wage garnishment guard employees from discharge by their employers because their wages have been garnished for any one indebtedness. The Wage and Hour Division of the United States Department of Labor enforces the provisions. The informed use of credit is administered by the United States Congress and stabilizes economic acts to be enhanced with competition informed unto various financial institutions that are engaged in extension of consumer credit that would be strengthened otherwise by informed credit use.

Titles:
 Truth in Lending Act
 Fair Credit Reporting Act
 Credit Repair Organizations Act
 Fair Debt Collection Practices Act

References
Cornell University Law School Webpage 
FDIC Regulations- Consumer Credit Protection Act

External links
 Consumer Credit Protection Act (PDF/details) as amended in the GPO Statute Compilations collection
FDIC Laws, Regulations, Related Acts- Consumer Protection  
US CODE: Title 15, Chapter 41- Consumer Credit Protection 
Public Law 90-321, 90th Congress, S. 5: Consumer Credit Protection Act

Consumer protection legislation
United States federal labor legislation
1968 in law
90th United States Congress
1968 in the United States